Tim Mohr is a New York-based translator, writer, and editor.

Biography

Mohr's narrative history of East German punk rock and the role the movement played in bringing down the Berlin Wall and in forming the culture of 21st century Berlin was published in German by Heyne in March 2017 as Stirb nicht im Warteraum der Zukunft: Die ostdeutschen Punks und der Fall der Mauer and in English by Algonquin Books on 11 September 2018 as Burning Down the Haus: Punk Rock, Revolution, and the Fall of the Berlin Wall. Vogue magazine said the book was "a joy in the way it brings back punk's fury and high stakes", while the Wall Street Journal wrote, "Mr. Mohr has written an important work of Cold War cultural history." Rolling Stone called Burning Down the Haus "a thrilling and essential social history that details the rebellious youth movement that helped change the world," and named it a book of the year. It was also listed as a book of the year by Rough Trade, NPR music staff, Longreads, Bookpage, Amazon, and the Chicago Public Library; the book was also long-listed for the Andrew Carnegie Medal for Excellence in Nonfiction.

As a literary translator, he has translated the German novels Guantanamo, by Dorothea Dieckmann (published in the U.S. by Soft Skull and in the U.K. by Duckworth), Wetlands and Wrecked by Charlotte Roche (both published in the U.S. by Grove/Atlantic and in the U.K. by 4th Estate), Broken Glass Park, The Hottest Dishes of the Tartar Cuisine, Just Call Me Superhero, Baba Dunja's Last Love, and My Grandmother's Braid by Alina Bronsky (all published worldwide by Europa Editions), Tiger Milk by Stefanie de Velasco, The Second Rider, by Alex Beer, and two novels by Wolfgang Herrndorf: Tschick, published in English as Why We Took the Car, and Sand.

Guantanamo was the recipient of the Three Percent award for best translation of 2007. The Hottest Dishes was named to Publishers Weeklys Best Books of 2011 list and the Los Angeles Public Library's Best Books of 2011, and nominated for the 2013 IMPAC Dublin literary award. Tiger Milk was also long-listed for the IMPAC Dublin award.

A project Mohr was working on with Hunter S. Thompson at the time Thompson's death was published as the writer's final interview in Playboys May 2005 issue and later included in the book Ancient Gonzo Wisdom, published by Da Capo.

Mohr collaborated with original Guns N' Roses and Velvet Revolver bassist Duff McKagan on It's So Easy (and other lies), McKagan's memoir, published in October, 2011. The Los Angeles Public Library included It's So Easy on its list of the best books of the year, and the book was also named one of Amazon.com's "Best Books of 2011: Entertainment Section". Mohr also edited Gil Scott-Heron's posthumous memoir, The Last Holiday, which was published in January 2012.

In April 2014, KISS frontman Paul Stanley published Face the Music, a memoir he collaborated on with Mohr. The book peaked at number two on the New York Times Best Seller list.

In June, 2021, Nonbinary, the memoir by Genesis P-Orridge, which Mohr collaborated on during P-Orridge's final years of life, was published a year after the death of the industrial music icon and cultural provocateur.

References

External links
 German-language profile of Mohr in the Vienna daily paper Wiener Zeitung.
 Love German Books on Guantanamo.
 Words Without Borders on Guantanamo.
 A review in Slate that calls Wetlands the 2 Girls 1 Cup of novels.

Living people
German–English translators
Year of birth missing (living people)